The Park Ridge Youth Campus, or just The Youth Campus, was a school and orphanage in Park Ridge, Illinois from 1908 to 2012.  The campus is on the National Register of Historic Places as the Illinois Industrial School for Girls, and was also known as the Park Ridge School for Girls.  The campus is now Prospect Park and owned by the Park Ridge Park District.

History

Evanston
The Youth Campus traced its foundation to 1877 as the Industrial School for Girls in what was then South Evanston, Illinois. It was the first such school for girls in Illinois. In 1879, Illinois General Assembly passed a general law to allow industrial schools for girls, and on October 1, 1879, the school reorganized with a corporate charter under the new law. An 1882 lawsuit challenged the constitutionality of such schools in Illinois, but the court ruled in favor of the school's existence, judging it to be "of the same character" as the power of parens patriae already in the common law, and that the school was not a prison and committing a child to the school was not imprisonment. 

The Record and Appeal, the organ of the school, was established in 1884. It recorded the work of the home and appealed for sympathy and help. Mary Crowell Van Benschoten, a trustee for fifteen years, served as editor for eight years.

After some complaints of mismanagement in 1894 and 1895, Illinois governor John P. Altgeld attempted to discharge all 105 girls, but they refused to leave.

As early as 1903 there were calls to move and reorganize the school on the "cottage plan": for example by a T.H. MacQuerary, of the Chicago Parental School, in the American Journal of Sociology.

In 1906, a scandal over placement of some girls into poor homes, and the mismanagement of money, caused a change in leadership.  After the directors were reorganized, Jane Addams served on the school's board of directors.

In early 1907, the Board of Directors announced that they planned to leave Evanston and relocate to a new rural location in Park Ridge.  With 125 girls and mounting financial difficulties, the school arranged for a charity baseball game that included a semi-professional team run by Cap Anson to be played at West Side Park.

Park Ridge

The facility was relocated to Park Ridge in 1908 and renamed the Park Ridge School for Girls in 1913.

Several of the buildings were funded by Julius Rosenwald, and were designed by Holabird & Roche, the same firm which designed the Chicago Board of Trade Building and Soldier Field.  Eight of the campus buildings are contributing elements of the campus' listing on the National Register of Historic Places.

When boys were first admitted in 1980, the facility was renamed the Park Ridge Youth Campus, before being simply renamed The Youth Campus in the 1990s.

By the 2011 the school services were being provided by Maine Township High School District 207.

After school
The Youth Campus closed in the summer of 2012.  The organization merged into the existing Chicago not-for-profit organization Children's Home + Aid.

The campus itself was split into parcels, with plans to sell the north part, approximately 60%, to Mark Elliott Corporation for housing development, and the south part, approximately 40%, to the Park Ridge Recreation and Park District for $6.4 million.  The Park District voters approved a referendum in April 2013 for a $13.2 million bond for the purchase and conversion to a park.  The Park District's property was re-opened as Prospect Park in May 2016.

Except for Emery Cottage, Solomon Cottage, and Wohlers Hall, the Park District had the campus buildings torn down in March 2015; in exchange for allowing demolition, the Illinois Historic Preservation Agency required that the demolished buildings be recorded with architectural details, that Solomon Cottage and Wohlers Hall be restored, and that Emery Cottage also remain preserved.  The Solomon Cottage, built in 1908, was leased on a long-term basis to the Park Ridge Historical Society in 2016, and renovated in 2017 to become the historical society's Park Ridge History Center.

References

External links

  — former official site
 
 Park Ridge History Center — official website of the Park Ridge Historical Society located on campus site
 Prospect Park — park summary and amenities list on the Park Ridge Park District website
 Park Ridge School for Girls at the Ryerson & Burnham Archives of the Art Institute of Chicago — photographs

1877 establishments in Illinois
1900s architecture in the United States
2012 disestablishments in Illinois
Buildings and structures completed in 1908
Campuses
Defunct schools in Illinois
National Register of Historic Places in Cook County, Illinois
Orphanages in the United States
Park Ridge, Illinois
Parks in Cook County, Illinois
Residential buildings on the National Register of Historic Places in Illinois
School buildings on the National Register of Historic Places in Illinois